The Måbø Bridge is a stone arch bridge over the Bjoreio River in the Måbø Valley just below Lake Måbø (Måbøvatnet) in the municipality of Eidfjord in Vestland, Norway.

The bridge has protected status as cultural heritage. The bridge was built as part of the first road into the Måbø Valley, constructed from 1900 to 1916. Today's Norwegian National Road 7 passes nearby, looping out of the Kvernhushaug Tunnel (below) and into the Måbø Tunnel (above). The bridge was taken out of service when the new route for National Road 7 was completed. The previous bridges in the Måbø Valley, predating the road built in 1900, were probably wooden beam bridges.

References

External links
 Old photo of the Måbø Bridge at Digitalt museum

Road bridges in Vestland
Stone bridges
Eidfjord